Thudar Katha is a 1991 Malayalam language film. Directed by Dennis Joseph. Produced by Thampi Kannamthanam. The Film starrs Sai Kumar, Maathu, Sukumari, Devan, Vijayaraghavan, Sreenivasan. The Film has musical score by S.P. Venkatesh. The songs of this movie are very popular.

Plot
Vishnu, who is from a middle-class family, falls in love with a princess. However, Vishnu's life takes a turn when the princess's parents are against their relationship.

Cast
Sai Kumar as Vishnu, the music teacher
Maathu as Lakshmi the princess.
Sreenivasan as Shivan (Vishnu's elder brother)
Sukumari as princess' caretaker
Rajan P. Dev as receiver of the palace
Devan as prince Ravi Varma
Vijayaraghavan as Sudhakaran, receiver's son
Jagathy Sreekumar as dance teacher
Kunchan as English teacher
Prathapachandran as Advocate
Bobby Kottarakkara as Tonga rider
Meena as the bedridden mother of Vishnu and Shivan
Mohan Jose as police officer
Jagannathan

Soundtrack
The music was composed by S. P. Venkatesh and the lyrics were written by O. N. V. Kurup.

References

1991 films
1990s Malayalam-language films
Films directed by Dennis Joseph